WCPA may refer to:

 World Commission on Protected Areas
 WCPA (AM), an AM radio station located in Clearfield, Pennsylvania